
Gmina Zbiczno is a rural gmina (administrative district) in Brodnica County, Kuyavian-Pomeranian Voivodeship, in north-central Poland.

The gmina contains part of the protected area called Brodnica Landscape Park.

Villages
Gmina Zbiczno contains the following villages and settlements: Bachotek, Brzezinki, Ciche, Czyste Błota, Gaj-Grzmięca, Głowin, Godziszka, Grabiny, Grzmięca, Kaługa, Karaś, Koń, Ładnówko, Ławy Drwęczne, Lipowiec, Mieliwo, Najmowo, Pokrzydowo, Robotno, Robotno-Fitowo, Rosochy, Równica, Rytebłota, Sosno Szlacheckie, Staw, Strzemiuszczek, Sumówko, Sumowo, Szramowo, Tęgowiec, Tomki, Wysokie Brodno, Zarośle, Zastawie, Zbiczno, Żmijewko and Żmijewo.

Neighbouring gminas
Gmina Zbiczno is bordered by the town of Brodnica and by the gminas of Biskupiec, Bobrowo, Brodnica, Brzozie, Jabłonowo Pomorskie and Kurzętnik.

References

Polish official population figures 2006

Zbiczno
Brodnica County